Polygala alpetris is a species of flowering plant in the milkwort family (Polygalaceae). It was described in 1823 and is found in Austria, France, Germany, Italy, Spain, Georgia, Turkey and Switzerland.

References 

alpestris
Flora of Austria
Flora of France
Flora of Germany
Flora of Italy
Flora of Spain
Flora of Switzerland
Flora of Turkey
Flora of Georgia (country)
Taxa named by Ludwig Reichenbach